The 15231 / 15232 Barauni–Gondia Express is an express train belonging to East Central Railway zone that runs between  and  in India. It is currently being operated with 15231/15232 train numbers on a daily basis.

Service

The 15231/Barauni–Gondia Express has an average speed of 46 km/hr and covers 1524 km in 32h 50m. The 15232/Gondia–Barauni Express has an average speed of 43 km/hr and covers 1524 km in 35h 30m.

Coach composition

The train has standard ICF rakes with a max speed of 110 kmph. The train consists of 22 coaches:

 1 AC II Tier
 3 AC III Tier
 9 Sleeper coaches
 7 General Unreserved
 2 Seating cum Luggage Rake

Route & Halts

Traction
It is hauled by a Samastipur based WAP-4 electric locomotive from end to end.

See also 

 Barauni Junction railway station
 Gondia Junction railway station

Notes

References

External links 

 15231/Barauni - Gondia Express
 15232/Gondia - Barauni Express

Transport in Barauni
Express trains in India
Rail transport in Uttar Pradesh
Rail transport in Bihar
Rail transport in Madhya Pradesh
Rail transport in Chhattisgarh
Rail transport in Maharashtra
Railway services introduced in 2013